Duse or Dusé may refer to:

People

Surname
 Carlo Duse (1898–1956), Italian film actor
 Eleonora Duse (1858–1924), Italian actress
 Eugenio Duse (1889–1969), Italian stage and film actor
 Vittorio Duse (1916–2005), Italian actor, screenwriter and film director

Given name
 Duse Nacaratti (1942–2009), Brazilian actress and comedian
 Dusé Mohamed Ali (1866–1945), Sudanese-Egyptian actor and political activist

Places
 Duse Bay, Antarctica